Noyant-d'Allier is a commune in the Allier department in Auvergne in central France. The writer Jeanne Cressanges (born in 1929) is a native from Noyant-d'Allier. This is the first neighbourhood in France where many Vietnamese people officially settle down. Most of Vietnamese people there were born in France of full or partially Vietnamese descent.

Population

See also
Communes of the Allier department

References

Communes of Allier
Allier communes articles needing translation from French Wikipedia